Itremo is a town and commune in Madagascar. It belongs to the district of Ambatofinandrahana, which is a part of Amoron'i Mania Region. The population of the commune was estimated to be approximately 7,000 in 2001 commune census.

Only primary schooling is available. The majority 70% of the population of the commune are farmers, while an additional 29.5% receives their livelihood from raising livestock. The most important crops are rice and peanuts, while other important agricultural products are beans and cassava. Services provide employment for 0.5% of the population.

References and notes 

Populated places in Amoron'i Mania